Lisa de Nikolits is a Canadian writer and art director who is originally from South Africa but moved to Canada in 2000. Her fiction novels and short stories have earned writing awards several times, and been favourably called out in Canadian literature sources, newspapers, and magazines. She is a member of Crime Writers of Canada, the International Thriller Writers, and Sisters in Crime.

Background
De Nikolits was born in South Africa. She grew up on a smallholding in Gauteng. She has a Bachelor of Arts Degree in English literature and Philosophy from the University of the Witwatersrand, Johannesburg. In 2000, de Nikolits moved to Canada where she became a Canadian citizen in 2003. She has worked as an art director in the United States, Australia and Britain for Marie Claire, Vogue Australia, and Vogue Living. She has worked on Hello! Canada, Canadian Health & Lifestyle, Canadian Living, Cosmetics and other Canadian magazine titles.

Writing
De Nikolits is the author of eleven novels and the recipient of several awards and honours. Her title The Occult Persuasion and The Anarchist's Solution was longlisted for The Sunburst Awards 2020. The stories of de Nikolits and three other members of the writer's group Mesdames of Mayhem were presented in CBC Documentary in October 2019, The Mesdames of Mayhem, a CBC GEM documentary. Her books were chosen as a Chatelaine Editor's Pick, Canadian Living Magazine Must Read, and a feature reader.

Published books
Everything You Dream is Real, Inanna, 336 pages, 2022
The Rage Room, Inanna, 312 pages, 2020
The Occult Persuasion and The Anarchist's Solution, Inanna, 300 pages, 2019
Una furia dell'altro mondo, Edizioni le Assassine , 398 pages, 2019
Rotten Peaches, Inanna, 300 pages, 2018
No Fury Like That, Inanna, 320 pages, 2017The Nearly Girl, Inanna, 312 pages, 2016Between The Cracks She Fell, Inanna, 300 pages, 2015The Witchdoctor's Bones, Inanna, 388 pages, 2014A Glittering Chaos, Inanna, 344 pages, 2013West of Wawa, Inanna, 312 pages, 2011The Hungry Mirror, Inanna, 354 pages, 2010

Writing awardsThe Hungry Mirror, longlisted for a ReLit award, 2011The Occult Persuasion and the Anarchist's Solution, longlisted for a Sunburst Award for Excellence in Canadian Literature of the Fantastic, 2020The Rage Room, finalist International Book Awards (IBA), Science Fiction, 2021

Other published works
 Flash Fiction Online, The Love Triangle, Maudlinhouse.net, 2014
 Canadian Woman Studies Journal, Women Writing4: Remembering: Inanna, Winter 2012/Spring 2013, poem.
 Short Story Online, Henry and Hannah, Maudlinhouse.net, 2014
Other honors
 Served as a judge for the Hamilton Literary Awards 2014, Fiction.
 Guest Blogger on Open Book: Toronto, 2013
 Featured Guest on SheDoesTheCity'', June 2010

References

External links
Official website

Canadian women novelists
South African emigrants to Canada
People from Johannesburg
Writers from Toronto
21st-century Canadian novelists
Canadian women short story writers
University of the Witwatersrand alumni
21st-century Canadian short story writers
21st-century Canadian women writers
Year of birth missing (living people)
Living people